Louis Wilson Menk (April 8, 1918 - November 23, 1999) was an American railway worker and executive. He served as the last president of Northern Pacific Railway 1966-1970, before the railroad was merged into Burlington Northern Railroad, and the first president and second chairman of Burlington Northern.  Menk was also selected as Modern Railroads (now Railway Age) Man of the Year for 1967, an award that has continued annually and is now known as Railroader of the Year.

Early life
Menk was the son of Louis Albert and Daisy Deane (Frantz) Menk. He married Martha Jane Swan on May 30, 1942. They had two children, David Louis and Barbara Ann.

Menk attended University of Denver, and Harvard Business School's six-week Advanced Management Program. He received honorary LL.D. degrees from Northwestern University (1959), Drury College (1965), University of Denver (1966), and Monmouth College.

Career

 1937 to 1940, telegrapher, Union Pacific Railroad
 1940 to 1965, telegrapher, dispatcher, chief dispatcher, trainmaster, vice-president, president, St. Louis-San Francisco Railway
 1965 to 1966, president and director, Chicago, Burlington and Quincy Railroad
 October, 1966 [to March, 1970], president and director, Northern Pacific Railway.
 1970 to 1981, president(1970–71), CEO(1971–78), chairman(1971-1981), Burlington Northern
 1982-1983, Chairman, International Harvester (CEO May–November 1982)

Directorships
Chicago, Burlington and Quincy; Colorado and Southern; Northern Pacific Transport; Cuyuna Realty; Monad Company; Association of American Railroads; First National Bank of Chicago; American Investment Company; Servomation Corporation; First Trust of St. Paul; Hunt Foods; General Mills; Brown Shoe Company.

Community Involvement
Clubs: St. Paul; Metro; Improvement Commission Greater St. Paul United Fund; Upper Midwest Development Council; St. Paul Area Chamber of Commerce; Government Council on Executive Reorganization; Advisory Committee, Minnesota Department of Economic Development; Transportation Center, Northwestern University; Chicago Area Council; Boy Scouts of America; Indianhead Committee; Summit School; Minnesota Club of St. Paul; St. Paul Athletic Club; Somerset Country Club; Transportation Club of St. Paul; Traffic Club of Minnesota; Traffic Club of Chicago; Union League of Chicago; Glen View Country Club; Chicago Club; Noonday; Bellerive Country Club; Masons; Presbyterian.

Papers
Louis Menk papers, 1953-1981.

Correspondence, speeches, scrapbooks, memorabilia, printed matter, and related papers documenting the career of this railroad executive who was president of the St. Louis-San Francisco Railway Company (1962–1965), the Chicago, Burlington and Quincy Railroad Company (1965–1966), the Northern Pacific Railway Company (1966–1970), and Burlington Northern Inc. (1970–1978, and chairman 1978-1981). He was also one of the principal architects of the 1970 merger that created the Burlington Northern; . (18 boxes and 4 microfilm reels).

Publications
Menk, Louis W. A Railroad Man Looks At America; Excerpts from the Speeches of Louis W. Menk. No place: privately published, n.d. [circa 1974].

References

1918 births
1999 deaths
Dispatchers
Northern Pacific Railway people
University of Denver alumni
Harvard Business School alumni